During the 2007–08 English football season, Doncaster Rovers F.C. competed in League One.

Season summary
This was Doncaster's fourth consecutive season in League One.

With Adam Brown, Jan Budtz, Liam Green, Rob Pacey, Jon-Paul Pittman, and Sean Thornton released, several new players were brought in for the beginning of the season. James Hayter was bought from Bournemouth, Gordon Greer came from Kilmarnock, free agents Sam Hird and Neil Sullivan came from Leeds, Richie Wellens from Oldham, Martin Woods from Rotherham, and Matt Mills was loaned from Manchester City.

Rovers were in 4th place by the New Year, and by the last game of the season they were in 2nd place but needed a win at Cheltenham to guarantee promotion to the Championship. Cheltenham won, as did 3rd placed Nottingham Forest, so Doncaster had to compete in the play-offs. First, they drew away at Southend where Paul Heffernan was sent off for a "head butt", but in the home leg they won 5–1, with James Coppinger getting a hattrick.

The play-off final was at the new Wembley against a Leeds side that had failed to get an automatic place partly following a pre-season 15 point deduction for exiting administration without a CVA. The contest attracted an attendance of 75,132, the biggest crowd Doncaster had ever played in front of. From a Brian Stock corner, James Hayter headed in the only goal of the match in the 47th minute and Doncaster were promoted to the second tier after an absence of 50 years when they had been relegated at the end of the 1957–58 season.

Progress in the three cup tournaments was limited.

The average league attendance figure of 7,978 was marginally up on the previous season and the highest since the 1969-70 season.

During the season it was announced that Terry Bramall and Dick Watson had become equal controlling shareholders alongside John Ryan.

Squad

Statistics
Players with a zero in every column only appeared as unused substitutes.

|-
|colspan="16"|Players who left the club during the season:

|}

Goals record

Disciplinary record

References

External links
Doncaster FC Player Appearances | Past & Present | Soccer Base

Doncaster Rovers
Doncaster Rovers F.C. seasons